Aphrodite, Goddess of Love may refer to:

 The Goddess of Love or Aphrodite, Goddess of Love, a 1957 film by Fernando Cerchio and Victor Tourjansky
 Slave Women of Corinth or Aphrodite, Goddess of Love, a 1958 film by Mario Bonnard